Phantom Patrol is a 1936 American Western film directed by Charles Hutchison.

Plot

Cast 

Kermit Maynard as RCMP Sergeant Jim McGregor
Joan Barclay as Doris McCloud
Harry J. Worth as "Dapper" Dan Geary & Stephen Morris
Paul Fix as Henchman Jo-Jo Regan
George Cleveland as Inspector McCloud
Julian Rivero as Frenchie Le Farge
Eddie Phillips as Henchman Emile
Roger Williams as Henchman Gustaf
Dick Curtis as Henchman Josef
Rocky the Horse as Rocky - Jim's Horse

Soundtrack 
Kermit Maynard - "On Your Guard" (Written by Didheart Conn)

External links 

1936 films
1936 Western (genre) films
American black-and-white films
Royal Canadian Mounted Police in fiction
American Western (genre) films
Northern (genre) films
Films based on works by James Oliver Curwood
Films directed by Charles Hutchison
1930s English-language films
1930s American films